The Deanwood–Minnesota Ave Line, designated Route U7, is a daily bus route operated by the Washington Metropolitan Area Transit Authority between Deanwood station and Minnesota Avenue station of the Orange Line of the Washington Metro. The line runs every 20–24 minutes during weekdays, every 24 minutes on Saturdays and every 30 minutes on Sundays. Trips take roughly 30 minutes. During weekday midday and all day on Saturday, trips are extended from Minnesota Avenue to Greenway (Minnesota Ave. & Ridge Road) which roughly take 32 minutes.

Background
Route U7 operates between Deanwood station and Minnesota Avenue station via Mayfair, providing residents quick and easy access to Metrorail stations running along the former route V7 and V8 routings. Route U7 operates out of Southern Avenue division during the weekdays and out of Bladensburg division during the weekends.

History
During WMATA's Fiscal Year of 2015, they announced a series of proposals of simplification affecting the current routes U2, U4, U5, U6, U8, V7, V8, and V9.

At the time of the proposals, the routes were suffering from on-time performances, and several bus bunching on the routes.

U2, V7, V8, V9
For routes U2, V7, V8, V9, it goes as the following:
 Route U2 will have daily service at all times between Capitol Heights station and Anacostia station via the current U8 route between Capitol Heights station and Minnesota Avenue station via Nannie Helen Burroughs Avenue, then via the current U2 route to Anacostia station.
 Routes V7, V8: Daily service at all times between Capitol Heights station and Navy Yard–Ballpark station via the current U8 route between Capitol Heights station and Minnesota Avenue station, then via the current V7 route to Navy Yard Ballpark station. The routing between Deanwood Station and Minnesota Avenue stations will be replaced by a proposed route U4 re-route.
 Route V9: Peak period service between Benning Heights and Bureau of Engraving via the current V9 route between Benning Heights and Navy Yard Ballpark station, then via the current V7 route to Bureau of Engraving.

The reason for the changes was for enhance connectivity between points of regional demand, create a better balance of capacity and demand lines serving the Minnesota Avenue, and reduce or eliminate service with low productivity on the line. According to WMATA. there will be approximately 700 of 5,300 weekday passenger trips (13%), 750 of 3,200 Saturday passenger trips (23%) and 600 of 2,900 Sunday passenger trips (21%) that will be affected by shortening routes V7 and V8 at Navy Yard Station if the changes occur. Weekday passengers affected may be less due to the proposed extension of route V9.

U4

For route U4, it goes as the following:
 Route U4 will have daily service at all times between River Terrace and Deanwood Station on its current route between River Terrace and Minnesota Avenue station, then operate along the current route of V7 and V8 from Minnesota Avenue to Deanwood stations.
 Route U4 would no longer serve the portion of the current route between Minnesota Avenue station and Sheriff Road having it replaced by a  new route U7.

This rerouting was to create a better balance of capacity and demand on lines serving the Minnesota Avenue station.

U5, U6

For routes U5, U6, it goes as the following:
 Routes U5, U6 would have daily service at all times via the portion of the current route between Minnesota Avenue station and Marshall Heights and Lincoln Heights. Service to Mayfair will be discontinued. 
 A new Route U1 would serve the portion of the current routes between Minnesota Avenue station and Mayfair and Parkside.

The rerouting was to improve reliability of service by operating shorter routes and create a better balance of capacity and demand throughout the line. Performance measures has an on-time performance is 78 percent compared to the target of 81 percent.

Changes
In June 2015, WMATA announced a series of changes that'll affect the current U2, U4, U5, U6, U8, V7, V8, and V9.

WMATA created the Deanwood–Minnesota Ave Line with a route designation U7 on June 21, 2015. This new route will operate between Deanwood station and Minnesota Avenue station along Kenilworth Avenue Service Road. This route replaced a portion of routes V7 and V8 which were discontinued on the same day. The new route will provide service along Kenilworth Avenue Service Road in order to improve on time performance to new routes V2 and V4.

Also routes U2, V7, and V8 were replace by routes V2 and V4, V9 was renamed route V1, and U8 was shorten from Capitol Heights station to Minnesota Avenue station.

During WMATA 2019 Fiscal Year, it was proposed to extended route U7 to Mayfair along the U5, U6 routing similar to the FY2015 budget proposal and U and V line study in 2015. It was also proposed for route U7 to be extend service from the Minnesota Ave station to the intersection of Minnesota Avenue & Ridge Road SE between 9 a.m. and 4 p.m. weekdays, and 7 a.m. and 7 p.m. on Saturdays to provide connections to the Minnesota Avenue shopping corridor. The changes were to retain direct connections between Mayfair and Parkside, Minnesota Ave station, and the Minnesota Avenue shopping corridor during the primary shopping hours and to improve productivity by rerouting and extending Route U7 to serve moderate to high density residential and commercial corridors as route U7 only have service along the Kenilworth Avenue service road.

Performance measures according to WMATA goes as the following as of the FY2016 budget:

On June 24, 2018, route U7 was rerouted along Kenilworth Terrace, Foote Street, Barnes Street, Hayes Street, and Jay Street to serve Mayfair to replace the U5, U6 which were shorten to Minnesota Avenue station. Also, route U7 was extended from Minnesota Avenue station along Minnesota Avenue to serve Greenway during the Weekday midday and all day Saturday.

During the COVID-19 pandemic, Route U7 was reduced to operate on its Saturday supplemental schedule during the weekdays beginning on March 16, 2020. On March 18, 2020, the line was further reduced to operate on its Sunday schedule. Weekend service was later suspended on March 21, 2020. Additional service and weekend service was restored on August 23, 2020, including extending service to Greenway during the weekday peak hours.

In February 2021,  during the FY2022 budget, WMATA proposed to eliminate the U7 section between Deanwood station and Greenway due to low federal funding.

References

2015 establishments in Washington, D.C.
U7